Lohe  or Löhe may refer to:

 Johann Konrad Wilhelm Löhe (1808–1872), Lutheran leader
 Frederic Löhe (born 1988), German football player
 Lohe-Föhrden, Rendsburg-Eckernförde, Germany
 Lohe-Rickelshof, Dithmarschen, Germany
 Lohe, a district in Barßel, Germany
 Lohe, a district in Lippstadt, Germany
 Lohe, a district in Stöckse, Germany
 Löhe Memorial Library, part of Australian Lutheran College, named after Johannes Paul Löhe

See also
 Luohe, a city in Henan Province, China

Surnames of German origin